Centaur is a pinball machine designed by Jim Patla and produced by Bally. The game was inspired by the classic Bally's 1956 Balls-A-Poppin that was the first flipper pinball machine with multiball. Because of its success, the pinball machine was re-released in 1983 as Centaur II. The re-release has only a different backbox and was otherwise unchanged.

Description
The artwork of Centaur features black and white horror design with flashy red and yellow light. The ultimate goal of the pinball machine is to destroy centaur - a half-man half-motorcycle creature.

Reasons for the success of the game include its well made sound effects including speech, 5-balls multiball, a playfield magnet and fast but fair gameplay.

Digital versions
Centaur is available as a licensed table of The Pinball Arcade for several platforms.

References

External links
 
 

Bally pinball machines
1981 pinball machines